Dhananjoy Tripura is an Indian Social Activist and politician representing Raima Valley Assembly constituency in the Tripura Legislative Assembly. He is the candidate of the IPFT to win a seat in 2018 Tripura Legislative Assembly election for the party in the state

In 2022, Dhanajoy Tripura left IPFT and joined Tipra Motha.

References

Living people
Tripura MLAs 2018–2023
Year of birth missing (living people)